Jimmy Ye Liang Jun (born 1967) is a Singaporean former singer and Director at Singapore Management University (SMU).

A former law lecturer who left the legal profession for music and show business, he is also currently Director, SMU Office of Student Life while still active as a performer and creative director for big events such as Sing.浪。An accomplished Singapore songwriter, composer and artist, Jimmy Ye's music has mesmerised and enchanted listeners all over Asia. He has written hits for superstars of the Chinese music scene, including Jackie Cheung, Andy Lau, Anita Mui, Leslie Cheung, Jeff Chang, Jolin Tsai, Alan Tam and Kit Chan.

Singing career 
Ye started his singing career as a freelance singer, performing at Singapore Tourism Board and private functions.

In 1992, Ye signed with Sony Music and released his first album, Give Me Your Love, which he wrote three of the tracks.

In 1996, Ye with Liang Wern Fook, created a Mandarin musical, December Rains, with George Chan and Kit Chan as the main leads.

In 1997, Ye became a songwriter after five years as a singer. He was approached by Television Corporation of Singapore to write songs for its actors.

In 2016, Ye held his first solo concert at the Esplanade.

On 6 February 2021, as part of the AL!VE series, Ye performed a solo concert at Capitol Theatre of the Capitol Singapore.

Academic career 
Ye was initially a law lecturer at the National University of Singapore but became a freelance singer.

In 2000, Ye joined Singapore Polytechnic as part of the founding team of lecturers for its Diploma in Music and Audio Technology. He subsequently joined SMU and became Director of Student Life.

Discography

References

1967 births
Living people
Singaporean people of Chinese descent
Mandopop singer-songwriters
Singaporean singer-songwriters
Singaporean composers
20th-century Singaporean male singers
Singaporean Mandopop singers
National University of Singapore alumni
21st-century Singaporean male singers